Aam papad is an Indian fruit leather made out of mango pulp mixed with concentrated sugar solution and sun dried.

Traditional Aam Papad is sweet, although it is available in different varieties. It can be preserved for months making it popular in the off season of mangoes.

Preparation

Mango pulp is mixed with potassium metabisulfite and spread on trays to dry in the sun. After the first layer dries, another layer is spread over it and allowed to dry. The process is repeated until the desired thickness is reached. The thickness varies depending upon the quality of mango pulp used.  When this thickness is reached the aam papad is cut into pieces and wrapped in oiled paper or into different packages.

Aam Papad can be consumed in any season as it can be preserved for a long period of time.

Aam Papad is manufactured in North India as well as South India. In the South Indian state of Andhra Pradesh, the Adavinekkalam village in East Godavari district is famous for its aam papad.

Aam Papad is also exported abroad from India. In 2011, the Canadian Food Inspection Agency warned sulphites-sensitive people to avoid the "Indican" brand Aam Papad, as it contained sulphites but did not declare that on the label.

References

Indian snack foods
Andhra cuisine